Daniel Martin Kelly OBE FRSA (born 1959) is a British sociologist and  the Royal College of Nursing Chair of Nursing Research at Cardiff University. He is known for his works on cancer and palliative care and received Order of the British Empire for his services to cancer care research and education. He was made a Fellow of the Royal College of Nursing in 2016.

References

Living people
Social psychologists
1959 births
British nurses
Nursing researchers
British sociologists
Academics of Cardiff University
Academics of Middlesex University
Members of the Order of the British Empire
Alumni of Goldsmiths, University of London

Fellows of the Royal College of Nursing